Panamah is a Danish electronic group from Copenhagen made up of DJ producer Anders Christensen, guitarist Peter Lützen and lead singer Amalie Stender. The group's minimalist pop approach to electronic music has attracted attention particularly with their 2010 debut single "Ikke for sent", also remixed by Boom Clap Bachelors in April 2010. Influences include Junior Boys, Booka Shade, Bat For Lashes as well as Everything but the Girl, Kate Bush and Simon & Garfunkel. The band also released a successful single "DJ Blues"

Discography

Albums

Singles

References

External links 
Myspace
Last.fm

Danish musical groups